The inverse second or reciprocal second (s−1) is a unit of frequency, defined as the multiplicative inverse of the second (a unit of time). It is dimensionally equivalent to:
 hertz (Hz) – the SI unit for frequency
 radian per second (rad⋅s−1) – the SI unit for angular frequency and angular velocity
 becquerel (Bq) – the SI unit for the rate of occurrence of aperiodic or stochastic radionuclide events
 baud (Bd) – the unit for symbol rate over a communication link
 of strain rate.

See also
Aperiodic frequency
Inverse metre
Unit of time

References
"The SI unit of frequency is given as the hertz, implying the unit cycles per second; the SI unit of angular velocity is given as the radian per second; and the SI unit of activity is designated the becquerel, implying the unit counts per second. Although it would be formally correct to write all three of these units as the reciprocal second, the use of the different names emphasises the different nature of the quantities concerned." 
"(d) The hertz is used only for periodic phenomena, and the becquerel (Bq) is used only for stochastic processes in activity referred to a radionuclide." 

Units of frequency